Joseph Alexandre Pierre, vicomte de Ségur (1756–1805), was a French poet, songwriter, and playwright.

Life
Ségur was born in Paris as the son of Philippe Henri de Ségur, Marquis of Ségur, and Louise Anne Madeleine de Vernon. In reality, he was the son of the best friend of his father, Pierre Victor, baron de Besenval de Brünstatt, who became notorious during the French Revolution. He was Colonel of the Regiments of Noailles and Lorraine, and of the Dragoons of Ségur during the Ancien Régime.

Ségur spent much of his life composing poems, songs, and comedies. Mirroring the circumstances of his birth, he had many children outside of wedlock, to whom he gave his name and whose education he financed.

He hired the architect Perrard de Montreuil to build a house at the rue Chantereine to host his mistress Louise Julie Careau. This house later hosted the loves of Joséphine and Bonaparte and became known as "Maison du 18 Brumaire". He had two sons with Careau: Alexandre-Philippe de Ségur (1781 – 10 February 1803) and Alexandre, Vicomte de Ségur (1793 – 28 April 1864).

In 1789, Ségur was elected a Deputy for the Nobility of Paris for the Estates-General. He remained loyal to the King and the monarchy but participated very little in the debates. In 1790, he retired from political life and occupied himself with literature, publishing dramas and comedies.

In 1793, Ségur was imprisoned during The Terror period of the French Revolution in the prisons of Saint-Lazare, as were André Chénier and other artists of the time. The actor Charles de La Buissière managed to get himself employed at the Bureau of the Committee for Public Health. La Buissière destroyed the accusation file for Ségur along with those of many other personalities of the Parisian scene, saving their lives.

From 1796 to the end of 1801, Ségur participated in the activities of the singing society of the Diners du Vaudeville, where he was known as "Ségur Jeune" (Young Segur), along with his brother Louis-Philippe de Ségur, known as "Ségur ainé", or Old Ségur.

Ségur died at the age of 48 in the company of Mademoiselle d'Avaux, his mistress of twelve years, while he was recovering from a chest illness at Bagnères-de-Bigorre. His last posthumous publication, the memories of the baron de Besenval, his assumed father, provoked a scandal in society at the time.

References

External links
 His theatre plays and their performances in the site CÉSAR
 The tomb of Joseph-Alexandre de Ségur at Trébons (Hautes-Pyrénées)
 Textes en ligne: C'est le même, 1798, L'opéra comique, 1799, Le fou par amour, 1791, Le retour du mari, 1792, Les vieux fous, 1796.

Writers from Paris
1756 births
1805 deaths
18th-century French male writers
18th-century French dramatists and playwrights
18th-century French poets
French chansonniers